Kevin Michael Alejandro (born April 7, 1976) is an American actor and film director. He is known for his roles as Nate Moretta in the crime drama Southland, Forklift Mike in Parenthood, Jesús Velázquez in the supernatural thriller True Blood, Sebastian Blood / Brother Blood in the superhero series Arrow and as Daniel Espinóza in the comedy-crime drama Lucifer.

Career
Alejandro was born in San Antonio, Texas to Mexican parents of Spanish and English ancestry. He was featured on the ABC series Ugly Betty, playing Santos, the father of Justin Suarez and love interest of Hilda. At the time of the season 1 finale episode's filming, he had just become a series regular on the Fox network's newly introduced Drive, since cancelled. He was a featured player in the second season of the Showtime original series Sleeper Cell, playing Benito Velasquez, and also played Dominic Hughes in The Young and the Restless.

In 2006, he appeared in the NCIS episode "Driven" as character Jamie Jones. He made an appearance, along with fellow Ugly Betty actor Eric Mabius, in the CSI: Miami episode "One of Our Own", and another as a gay hustler in HBO's Big Love. He appeared on an episode of Charmed season 7 as Malvock, a cunning demon. He also appeared in the first few episodes of 24s fourth season, as a terrorist henchman, in which he also stars with Tony Plana, fellow Ugly Betty actor. Alejandro was a regular on the now defunct drama Shark as Deputy District Attorney Danny Reyes. and had a small role on The Cleaner, an A&E television series.

Alejandro appeared in the movie Crossing Over, which was released in February 2009, alongside Harrison Ford. He played Detective Nate Moretta in Southland, produced by Emmy Award winner John Wells. Southland was canceled by NBC Broadcasting just two weeks prior to the première of the show's sophomore run, but was then picked up by the cable network TNT. Alejandro appeared in the TV series The Mentalist Season 2, Episode 17 as Victor Bandino.

He had a role in Weeds, seasons 4 and 5. Drop Dead Divas Season 1 Episode 5 also features Alejandro as the wrongfully convicted Michael Fernandez. He appeared on Season 1 of Sons of Anarchy as one of the Mayan MC members, son of Marcus, the MC's president. Alejandro stars in the third and fourth seasons of the vampire series True Blood as Jesús Velázquez.

In 2011, he appeared in the movie Red State, opposite John Goodman and directed by Kevin Smith, as well a horror film Cassadaga. He also played Tony Arroyo, a homicide detective in the 2013 television show Golden Boy. Alejandro portrayed Sheriff Tommy Solano in the ABC / A&E series The Returned.

In 2013, Alejandro joined the CW series Arrow as Sebastian Blood/Brother Blood, recurring throughout the show's second season. In January 2016, he began his role on the Fox TV series Lucifer as LAPD Homicide Detective Dan Espinoza. Lucifer ran for three seasons before being cancelled by Fox, only to be picked up by Netflix since season four, which released 2019. Alejandro directed the episode "Once Upon a Time", which was intended to be aired in the series' fourth season but instead aired as a bonus episode on May 28, 2018 after the third season had concluded. He also directed the season 5 episode "Spoiler Alert", and in an interview with Tell-Tale TV, he confirmed he directed the season 6 premiere.

Filmography

Film

Television

Web

References

External links
 

1976 births
Living people
American male soap opera actors
American male film actors
American male television actors
Male actors from San Antonio
21st-century American male actors
American male actors of Mexican descent
American people of Spanish descent
American people of English descent
People from Snyder, Texas